Knattspyrnufélag Fjarðabyggðar (KFF) was an Icelandic football club from the town of Fjarðabyggð located on the east coast of Iceland.

History
The club was founded in 2001 with a merger of three local clubs, Íþróttafélagið Þróttur Neskaupstað, Ungmennafélagið Austri Eskifirði and Ungmennafélagið Valur Reyðarfirði. The next year, for the first time, Fjarðabyggð sent a women's team to play at league level. In 2010 Ungmennafélagið Súlan Stöðvarfirði came into the merger.

In 2022, the club merged with Leiknir Fáskrúðsfjörður to establish the new Knattspyrnufélag Austfjarða.

Managers
 Magni Fannberg Magnússon (2007-2008)

References

External links
 Official Website

Football clubs in Iceland
Association football clubs established in 2001
2001 establishments in Iceland
Association football clubs disestablished in 2022